Villem Aleksander Reinok (15 March 1882 Riga – 10 March 1958 Tallinn) was an Estonian politician. He was a member of I Riigikogu. He was a member of the parliament (Riigikogu) since 28 October 1922. He replaced Anton Uesson. On 24 November 1922, he resigned his position and he was replaced by Rudolf Paabo.

References

1882 births
1958 deaths
Members of the Riigikogu, 1920–1923